The May 2021 Democratic Unionist Party leadership election was triggered by Arlene Foster's resignation from leadership. It was the Democratic Unionist Party's first leadership election since the party's founding in 1971.

Foster released a statement on 28 April 2021 announcing her intention to resign as party leader on 28 May in order to provide party officers with some space to arrange for the leadership contest. Party chair Maurice Morrow later announced that the leadership election would take place on 14 May 2021.

Edwin Poots MLA won, with 19 votes from DUP MPs and MLAs, beating Sir Jeffrey Donaldson MP's 17 votes. At the same time, Paula Bradley MLA was elected as the party's deputy leader to replace Nigel Dodds, Baron Dodds of Duncairn, beating Gregory Campbell MP by 18 votes to 16.

After agreeing to a deal that resolved the stalemate over the Irish Language Act, Poots stood down as leader on 17 June after a meeting where a majority of DUP MLAs and MPs voted against the party nominating a replacement for Arlene Foster.

Background
Following the end of Brexit negotiations that culminated in the EU–UK Trade and Cooperation Agreement in 2020, party leader Arlene Foster was criticised for supporting prime minister Boris Johnson, who was blamed for the Irish Sea border due to the Northern Ireland Protocol. In contrast to most other DUP Northern Ireland Assembly members, Foster abstained in a vote on gay conversion therapy.

22 DUP Members of the Legislative Assembly and four Members of Parliament expressed no-confidence in her leadership in a letter.

Timeline
6 May 2021: Nominations closed at 17:00 BST
14 May 2021: Election day

Candidates

Declared

Declined

Results
The election was held on 14 May 2021, with the result announced on the same day at approximately 17:00 BST. Under the party's constitution, any party member that is either a Member of the Legislative Assembly or an MP in the House of Commons is entitled to vote. The electorate encompassed the DUP's 8 MPs and 28 MLAs. The five DUP members of the House of Lords were not permitted to vote.

References

Democratic Unionist Party leadership elections
Democratic Unionist Party leadership
Democratic Unionist Party leadership election
2021 elections in Northern Ireland